Film Workshop Co. Ltd., is a Hong Kong production company and film distributor. It was founded in April 1984 by producer/director Tsui Hark and his now ex-wife, Nansun Shi. Already a director with box office hits, Tsui wanted to create a workshop where the foremost filmmakers could work on films with artistic merit, and at the same time, films that could be commercially rewarding for the financiers behind his projects. The company has not produced a film since 2017.

Films
In 1984, Film Workshop's first film, Shanghai Blues, turned out to be both a critical and commercial success in Hong Kong; and so were the two subsequent films that Tsui directed: Working Class and Peking Opera Blues. At this time, Tsui invited other directors to join in. With Tsui producing, John Woo directed A Better Tomorrow, which grossed US$4.5 million locally to set a new record as the highest grossing motion picture in Hong Kong. After having a falling out during the making of A Better Tomorrow 2, they both split to produce their own films.

Film Workshop continues to produce the films that Tsui either produces or directs. This includes films such as A Better Tomorrow 2, A Better Tomorrow 3, the Once Upon a Time in China film series and Seven Swords.

Filmography
 1984 Shanghai Blues (上海之夜)
 1985 Working Class (打工皇帝)
 1986 Peking Opera Blues (刀馬旦)
 1986 A Better Tomorrow (英雄本色)
 1987 A Better Tomorrow II (英雄本色II)
 1987 A Chinese Ghost Story (倩女幽魂)
 1989 The Master (龍行天下)
 1989 The Killer (喋血雙雄)
 1989 A Better Tomorrow III: Love & Death in Saigon (英雄本色3之夕陽之歌)
 1990 Swordsman (笑傲江湖)
 1990 A Chinese Ghost Story II (倩女幽魂II：人間道)
 1991 A Chinese Ghost Story III (倩女幽魂III：道道道)
 1991 Once Upon a Time in China (黃飛鴻)
 1991 King of Chess (棋王)
 1992 Once Upon a Time in China II (黃飛鴻之二男兒當自強)
 1992 Swordsman II (笑傲江湖II東方不敗)
 1992 New Dragon Gate Inn (新龍門客棧)
 1993 The Magic Crane (新仙鶴神針)
 1993 Once Upon a Time in China III (	黃飛鴻之三獅王爭霸)
 1993 Once Upon a Time in China IV (黃飛鴻之四王者之風)
 1993 Green Snake (青蛇)
 1994 The Lovers (梁祝)
 1994 Once Upon a Time in China V (黃飛鴻之五龍城殲霸)
 1995 Love in the Time of Twilight (花月佳期)
 1995 The Chinese Feast (金玉滿堂)
 1995 The Blade (刀)
 1996 Tristar (大三元)
 1996 Shanghai Grand (新上海灘)
 1996 Black Mask (黑俠)
 1997 Once Upon a Time in China VI (黃飛鴻之西域雄獅)
 1997 Double Team (雙重火力)
 1997 Knock Off (迎頭痛擊)
 2000 Time and Tide (順流逆流)
 2001 The Legend of Zu (蜀山傳)
 2001 Black Mask 2: City of Masks (黑俠2)
 2004 Seven Swords (七劍)
 2007 Triangle (鐵三角)
 2008 Missing (深海尋人)
 2008 All About Women (女人不壞)
 2010 Detective Dee and the Mystery of Phantom Flame (狄仁傑之通天帝國)
 2011 Flying Swords of Dragon Gate (龍門飛甲)
 2013 Young Detective Dee: Rise of the Sea Dragon (狄仁傑之神都龍王)
 2017 The Thousand Faces of Dunjia (奇门遁甲)
 2018 Detective Dee: The Four Heavenly Kings (狄仁傑之四大天王)

External links
 Official website

Film production companies of Hong Kong
Entertainment companies established in 1984
1984 establishments in Hong Kong